Waalre is an affluent municipality and town in the province of North Brabant in the southern Netherlands, immediately south of the city of Eindhoven.

Population centres 
 Aalst
 Waalre

Waalre is the so-called Groenfontein (Green fountain). This stems from its civic policy to provide a diverse tree population in streets and lanes.

Waalre is considered one of the richest villages in the Netherlands due to the numerous millionaires living there. It was voted 7th best Dutch municipality to live in, according to a 2010 Elsevier research. The municipality is surrounded by woods, fields, and lakes. The nearest city is Eindhoven, which is situated on the other side of the A67 motorway.

The spoken language is Kempenlands (an East Brabantian dialect, which is very similar to colloquial Dutch).

Town council
The current town council was elected at the 2014 local elections.

Waalre Town Hall 
In July 2012 the town hall of Waalre was destroyed by a fire that resulted from two cars driving into the building from opposite ends at night.

Notable people 
 Geert Jan Jansen (born 1943 in Waalre) a Dutch painter and art forger, who was arrested in 1994 and convicted in 2000. 
 John Baselmans (born 1954 in Aalst) a Dutch artist, sculptor, graphic designer and illustrator, lives in Curaçao 
 Jan van den Dobbelsteen (born 1954 in Waalre) an interdisciplinary Dutch artist who teaches at Academy St. Joost
 Frans van Houten (born 1960) CEO of Royal Philips Electronics since 2011
 Martijn Oostra (born 1971 in Waalre) a Dutch graphic designer, photographer, artist and publicist

Gallery

References

External links

 
Municipalities of North Brabant
Populated places in North Brabant